Taneli Jarva is a Finnish musician born in Oulu, Northern Finland. He was the vocalist and bass player of the heavy metal band Sentenced from 1991 until leaving the group in 1995, citing creative differences.

In 1998, Jarva formed The Black League, which he considers his "brainchild and life's work". The Black League published five studio albums. The band was active until October 2014, when Jarva decided to call it quits due to "loss of personal inspiration".

Jarva was also the bass player for the extreme metal band Impaled Nazarene (1992–1996) and vocalist in the death metal band Chaosbreed (2003–2005).

He currently works as a tattoo artist at Tatuata in Helsinki and plays bass in Then Came Bronson, a Helsinki-based rock group.

References 

1975 births
Living people
Finnish heavy metal bass guitarists
Finnish heavy metal singers
People from Oulu
21st-century Finnish singers
21st-century bass guitarists